Charles W. Coleman (born 7 August 1932) is a former member of the Wisconsin State Assembly.

Coleman was born in Milwaukee, Wisconsin. He graduated from high school in Elkhorn, Wisconsin in 1950, as well as the University of Wisconsin–Madison (B.B.A., 1954; M.S., 1959).  During the Korean War, he served in the United States Army from 1954 to 1956. Coleman has six children.

Coleman was first elected to the Assembly in 1982. Additionally, he was a member of the Whitewater, Wisconsin Unified District Public School Board from 1978 to 1983 and Chairman of the Walworth County, Wisconsin Republican Party.

References

1932 births
Living people
Missing middle or first names
University of Wisconsin–Madison alumni
Military personnel from Wisconsin
United States Army soldiers
United States Army personnel of the Korean War
Politicians from Milwaukee
People from Whitewater, Wisconsin
School board members in Wisconsin
Republican Party members of the Wisconsin State Assembly